Howard Lew Lewis (21 August 1941 – 20 January 2018) was a British comedian and actor, best known for his roles in comedy series including Maid Marian and Her Merry Men, Brush Strokes and Chelmsford 123.

Biography
Lewis was born in London, England. His parents were both born in southern Wales (Tenby and Bridgend). As a young man, Lewis flat-shared with Ken Morley (Reg Holdsworth of Coronation Street) and Andy Carr, actor and screenwriter. His first job was with the Royal Air Force, where he was a computer operator. He worked for several years in computing and telecommunications, but when promoted to manager-level he decided instead to pursue acting as a career after being asked to fire a colleague whom he believed to be a good worker. He was married twice. His first marriage lasted just over a year. His second marriage was to Anna Goodall. They married in 1990 with Ken Morley as best man.

Howard loved reading and had over 35,000 books in his collection, many were first editions. His other hobby was trains and trainsets and tea was often passed on the back of a train that circumnavigated his living room. His favourite magazine was Private Eye and the Beano and Dandy comics which he collected for many decades.

Television
He appeared as one of the Merry Men in the 1989 BBC children's television comedy series Maid Marian and Her Merry Men.

Lewis featured as one of Robin Hood's followers in the 1991 film Robin Hood: Prince of Thieves, playing a character named Hal.

He appeared in two other prominent historical comedy series - as Blag in the Channel 4 sitcom Chelmsford 123 (1988) set during the Roman occupation of Britain in AD 123, and as assorted medieval peasants, (including Piers and Mr Applebottom) in The Black Adder (1983), set in 1485. His longest recurring role was as dim barman Elmo Putney in the comedy series Brush Strokes (1991), and he had minor parts in two Ronnie Barker sitcoms - The Magnificent Evans (1984) and Open All Hours (1985) - and the ITV comedy-drama Minder (1984).

He had a succession of minor roles in such notable series as:
 Dennis Potter's BBC television drama serial Pennies from Heaven (1978)
 Reilly, Ace of Spies about real-life Bond-model, spy Sidney Reilly (1983)
 An early episode of ITV's police procedural The Bill (1985)
 The Charmer (1987)
 "Now You See Them", a 1988 episode of the anthology drama series Dramarama
 Later episode(s) of the BBC Children's TV programme The Queen's Nose (1995)
 A 2003 episode of the long-running BBC medical drama Casualty

Films
Lewis appeared in several films, again mostly in minor roles. Notable film appearances included Terry Gilliam's 1985 film Brazil, where he played one of the Black Maria guards, and playing Hal in Robin Hood: Prince of Thieves.

In 2005, he played the part of Lillas Pastia, the innkeeper, in Bizet's Carmen at the Royal Albert Hall, London, and in 2007, played alongside Warwick Davis in the film Small Town Folk.

Death 
In an interview with the Scottish Mail on Sunday in late 2017, Lewis confirmed he had been diagnosed with dementia. His fellow actor and friend Tony Robinson announced on Twitter on 22 January 2018 that Lewis had died on 20 January 2018.

On 28 January 2018, it was reported that police in Edinburgh were investigating the circumstances surrounding the actor's death after his step-daughter Debora Milazzo claimed he had been placed on a regime of high-dose sedatives and maximum-strength opiate painkillers, and had been needlessly placed on the kind of treatment plan that would be prescribed for the terminal phase of a malignant disease, explaining that her father had not received a terminal diagnosis. Police Scotland confirmed it was investigating the complaint.

References 

1941 births
2018 deaths
English male comedians
English male film actors
English male television actors
Male actors from London